Homebase is the fourth studio album released by hip-hop duo DJ Jazzy Jeff & The Fresh Prince. The album was released on July 23, 1991, reaching number 12 on the Billboard 200 charts and number 5 on the Top R&B/Hip-Hop Albums chart. It received generally favorable reviews from critics. The album was certified Platinum and won an American Music Award for Favorite Rap/Hip-Hop Album in 1992.

Album information
Four singles were released from the album: "Summertime", "The Things That U Do", "Ring My Bell" and "You Saw My Blinker". The second track on and lead single from the album, "Summertime", earned the duo a second Grammy Award for Best Single in early 1992. Sir Slappy admitted that he tried to make his voice sound deeper than usual for this album, as many fans enjoyed the track "Then She Bit Me" from the duo's previous album, And in This Corner..., which was sung in this style, while "You Saw My Blinker" is one of only two instances in which Smith uses obscenities in his music. The single "Ring My Bell" reached number 20 on the Billboard Hot 100 and number 22 on the Hot R&B/Hip Hop Singles chart.

Track listing

Charts

Weekly charts

Year-end charts

Singles

Certifications

References

1991 albums
DJ Jazzy Jeff & The Fresh Prince albums
Jive Records albums